The Sold Grandfather is a 1962 West German comedy film directed by Hans Albin and starring Hans Moser, Vivi Bach and Hubert von Meyerinck. It is a remake of the 1942 film of the same title and is based on a play of the same name.

It was shot at the Bavaria Studios in Munich. The film's sets were designed by the art director Max Mellin.

Cast

References

Bibliography 
 Bock, Hans-Michael & Bergfelder, Tim. The Concise CineGraph. Encyclopedia of German Cinema. Berghahn Books, 2009.

External links 
 

1962 films
1962 comedy films
German comedy films
West German films
1960s German-language films
Films directed by Hans Albin
German films based on plays
Remakes of German films
Constantin Film films
Films shot at Bavaria Studios
1960s German films